Shinya Chiba may refer to:

 Shinya Chiba (footballer) (born 1983), Japanese former footballer
 Shinya Chiba (skier) (born 1961), Japanese former alpine skier